The Tatra 26 is a vintage 6x4 automobile produced by the Czech manufacturer Tatra in the late 1920s and early 1930s. It was developed on the basis of the T 12. However, tests showed that the engine from T 12 did not have enough power, and it was replaced by the Tatra 30 engine. The car had extreme off-road abilities - reportedly it was even able to climb staircases.

The Tatra 26 was the larger sister model of the middle-class type Tatra 30.

The vehicle had an air-cooled four-cylinder engine with 1680 cc and 24 hp (17.6 kW) of power. The maximum attainable speed of the  heavy car was 60–70 km/h. The car uses the Tatra backbone tube and independent half axles.

Versions
There were many different versions of this car. It was manufactured as a flatbed truck, a bus, a firetruck and others. A version with shortened wheelbase had additional side wheels to improve offroad capabilities.

Gallery

References

Tatra trucks
Cars powered by boxer engines
Rear-wheel-drive vehicles
Automobiles with backbone chassis